Parádsasvár is a small village  in northern Hungary. It is located in Heves County, in the Mátra mountains, between the towns Gyöngyös and Eger.

History 
This village was first mentioned in the 16th century, as property of Kristóf Országh. The next owner was Ungnád Kristóf, who was the Captain of the castle of Eger. From 1603, the Rákóczi family owned the village. In the 18th century Rákóczi Ferenc established a glassworks, which operated until 2005. Károlyi Castle was built in 1881, which later became a hunting lodge. The castle was designed by Miklós Ybl. The castle today is a five-star hotel.

Villages near by Parádsasvár 
Parád
Parádfürdő
Mátraháza
Mátrafüred

These towns have a common history.

References

External links
 Parádsasvár, Hungary

Populated places in Heves County